"Goin' Down" is a soft rock song written by Greg Guidry and David Martin and performed by Guidry. It reached #11 on the U.S. adult contemporary chart and #17 on the Billboard Hot 100 in 1982. The song was featured on his 1982 album, Over the Line.

The song was produced by Guidry and John Ryan and released on Columbia Records.

Charts

References

1982 songs
1982 debut singles
Columbia Records singles